Christopher Plummer (1929–2021) was a Canadian film, television and stage actor. On stage, Plummer's most notable roles were that of Cyrano de Bergerac in Cyrano (1974) and as John Barrymore in Barrymore. He won the Tony Award for Best Actor in a Play for these two roles. On film, Plummer is known for portraying Captain von Trapp in The Sound of Music (1965). He also appeared in Waterloo (1970), The Man Who Would Be King (1975), The Insider (1999), as Leo Tolstoy in The Last Station (2009), as Arthur Case in Inside Man (2006), and as J. Paul Getty in All the Money in the World (2017).

Plummer provided the voice of antagonist Charles F. Muntz in the Pixar animated film Up (2009).

Plummer won an Academy Award for Best Supporting Actor for his performance in Mike Mills' film Beginners (2010).

At the time of his death, he had been filming season 2 of Departure. He was set to play the lead in a film adaptation of King Lear to be filmed in summer 2021, but he died in February, thus being unable to take part in the film.

Film

Television

Theatre

Video games

See also
 List of awards and nominations received by Christopher Plummer

Notes

References

External links
Christopher Plummer at Allmovie

Christopher Plummer at Rotten Tomatoes

Male actor filmographies
American filmographies
Canadian filmographies